Mesurado River is a river of Liberia. It flows through the capital of Monrovia and is crossed by the People's Bridge, built in the 1970s.

References

External links

 
Montserrado County
Rivers of Liberia